Juan Augusto Huerta (born 22 July 1980, in Isidro Casanova) is a retired Argentine footballer.

Club career
Huerta has played for Nueva Chicago and Estudiantes de La Plata in the Primera División de Argentina.

Huerta, nicknamed "the lion", was a significant part of the 2006 championship team, but two major injuries kept him outside the pitch for almost two years. He re-appeared in 2008.

In 2009, he was part of the Estudiantes squad that won the Copa Libertadores 2009 championship, although his only contribution was a brief substitute appearance in their 3-0 win over Libertad in the group stage. After Estudiantes reinforced the midfield, Huerta asked for a transfer, and found a place in Chilean first division side San Luis Quillota.

References

External links
 Statistics at BDFA 
 

1980 births
Living people
Argentine footballers
Argentine expatriate footballers
Association football midfielders
People from La Matanza Partido
Sportspeople from Buenos Aires Province
Nueva Chicago footballers
Estudiantes de La Plata footballers
San Luis de Quillota footballers
Club Almirante Brown footballers
Sportivo Italiano footballers
Defensores de Cambaceres footballers
Flandria footballers
Argentine Primera División players
Argentine expatriate sportspeople in Chile
Expatriate footballers in Chile